Metropolis II (2011) is a kinetic sculpture by Chris Burden at the Los Angeles County Museum of Art.

Description
Materials include building blocks, Lego blocks, and Lincoln Logs.

The cars travel along 18 Teflon-coated tracks, including a six-lane freeway, at scale speeds ranging from bumper-to-bumper to 240 miles per hour. When the cars reach the bottom, they are connected by magnets to three conveyor belts and raised back to the top of the sculpture. Running at capacity, the sculpture can launch about 100,000 cars an hour. An operator stationed in the midst of the sculpture looks for accidents and can push an emergency stop button.

Burden described the piece as a "complicated roller-coaster system" and said that the goal was not to create a literal scale model of a city but to evoke a city's energy.  The work, he said, anticipates the era of driverless cars that Burden believed would put an end to traffic gridlock. Burden was unspecific about which city the sculpture depicts: "It could be Dubai or India or China. I think ultimately it’s any city." 

A smaller predecessor,  Metropolis I (2004), is in Japan at the 21st Century Museum of Contemporary Art, Kanazawa. Measuring  , that sculpture employs about 80 Hot-Wheels cars, which tend to fall off the track. Metropolis II cars are custom built and use magnets for traction.  Burden's name is on the tire sidewalls.

Construction, installation 
The sculpture was built by a team of eight people who began work in 2006 in Burden's Topanga Canyon studio, unveiling it there in 2011. It was reinstalled at the Los Angeles County Museum of Art's Broad Contemporary Art Museum in 2012 in a specially designed gallery with a viewing balcony. Billionaire Nicolas Berggruen purchased the work and loaned it to the museum through 2022.

References

Collection of the Los Angeles County Museum of Art
2011 sculptures
Kinetic sculptures in the United States
Articles containing video clips
Works by Chris Burden